The Elizabethtown Armory, at 205 Warfield St. in Elizabethtown, Kentucky, was built in 1948 for the Kentucky National Guard.  It was listed on the National Register of Historic Places in 2002.

It is a two-story yellow brick Modern Movement-style building with a two-story five-bay central block and one-story wings.

It was deemed significant "because of its association with the National Guard in Elizabethtown, and for its use as a community center for the citizens of the city. Besides its military duties, the armory has served as a community center for Elizabethtown. The Guard used to hold an annual bean soup dinner at the armory, and wrestling matches, basketball games, trade shows, and wedding receptions all take place in the armory drill hall."

References

National Register of Historic Places in Hardin County, Kentucky
Government buildings completed in 1948
Armories in Kentucky
Modern Movement architecture in the United States
1948 establishments in Kentucky
Modernist architecture in Kentucky
Kentucky National Guard
Community centers in Kentucky
Elizabethtown, Kentucky